Michael Stephen Wood (born September 3, 1954) is a former American football placekicker who played five seasons in the National Football League with the Minnesota Vikings, St. Louis Cardinals, San Diego Chargers and Baltimore Colts. He was drafted by the Minnesota Vikings in the eighth round of the 1978 NFL Draft. He played college football at Southeast Missouri State University and attended Kirkwood High School in Kirkwood, Missouri.

References

External links
Just Sports Stats

Living people
1954 births
Players of American football from Missouri
American football placekickers
Southeast Missouri State Redhawks football players
Minnesota Vikings players
St. Louis Cardinals (football) players
San Diego Chargers players
Baltimore Colts players
People from Kirkwood, Missouri